Federal Center SW is a Washington Metro station in an area known as the Southwest Federal Center in Washington, D.C., United States. The island-platformed station was opened on July 1, 1977, and is operated by the Washington Metropolitan Area Transit Authority (WMATA) and is located on the Blue, Orange, and Silver Lines. The station is located at 3rd and D Streets.

History
In preliminary maps, this was named Voice of America station, after the government-owned radio service located a block away. In September 1971, Department of Health, Education and Welfare secretary Eliot Richardson suggested the current name, noting that "The Voice of America is by far the smallest agency in the Southwest area". The station opened on July 1, 1977. Orange Line service to the station began upon the line's opening on November 20, 1978. Silver Line service at Federal Center SW began on July 26, 2014.

From March 26, 2020 until June 28, 2020, this station was closed due to the 2020 coronavirus pandemic.

Between January 15 to January 21, 2021, this station was closed because of security concerns due to the 2020 Inauguration.

Station layout

Notable places nearby 
 Museum of the Bible
 National Air and Space Museum
 National Museum of the American Indian
 United States Botanic Garden
 Several federal government buildings, including the Federal Emergency Management Agency (FEMA), the Department of Health and Human Services, NASA, United States Department of Housing and Urban Development, Voice of America radio and television studios, and the Ford House Office Building.

References

External links
 

 The Schumin Web Transit Center: Federal Center SW Station
 3rd Street entrance from Google Maps Street View

Washington Metro stations in Washington, D.C.
Railway stations in the United States opened in 1977
Stations on the Blue Line (Washington Metro)
Stations on the Orange Line (Washington Metro)
Stations on the Silver Line (Washington Metro)
1977 establishments in Washington, D.C.
Railway stations located underground in Washington, D.C.
Southwest Federal Center